The Grammy Award for Producer of the Year, Classical is an honor presented to record producers for quality classical music productions at the Grammy Awards, a ceremony that was established in 1958 and originally called the Gramophone Awards. Honors in several categories are presented at the ceremony annually by the National Academy of Recording Arts and Sciences of the United States to "honor artistic achievement, technical proficiency and overall excellence in the recording industry, without regard to album sales or chart position".

Originally known as the Grammy Award for Classical Producer of the Year, the award was first presented to James Mallinson at the 22nd Grammy Awards (1980). The name remained unchanged until 1998, when the category became known as Producer of the Year, Classical. According to the category description guide for the 52nd Grammy Awards, the award is presented to album producers "whose recordings, released for the first time during the eligibility year, represent consistently outstanding creativity in the production of classical recordings". Producers must have produced at least 51% playing time on three separately released recordings (only one of which can be an opera released in DVD format). Producers may submit content as a team only if they worked together exclusively during the period of eligibility. 
Anthony Tommasini, music critic for The New York Times, asserted that "In the struggling field of classical recording, it's the producers who take the real risks and make things happen." The honor is presented alongside the award for Producer of the Year, Non-Classical 

As of 2023, David Frost, Steven Epstein, Robert Woods and Judith Sherman share the record for most wins, with seven each. while James Mallinson has been presented the award three times. Two-time recipients include Joanna Nickrenz (once alongside Marc Aubort). Elaine Martone received the honor in 2007. David Frost is the son of Thomas Frost, who received an award in the same category in 1987.

Recipients

 Each year is linked to the article about the Grammy Awards held that year.

See also

 American classical music
 List of Grammy Award categories

References

General
  Note: User must select the "Producer" category as the genre under the search feature.

Specific

External links
Official site of the Grammy Awards

Awards established in 1980
Grammy Awards for classical music